Persoonia pinifolia, commonly known as pine-leaved geebung or as mambara in the Cadigal language, is a plant in the family Proteaceae and is endemic to the Sydney region of New South Wales. It is an upright, woody shrub with soft, pine-like foliage and long, terminal racemes of small yellow flowers in late winter to summer.

Description
Its young branches are moderately hairy. The ends of the leaves are often curved. The flowers are arranged in long, terminal racemes making them much more conspicuous than those of most other persoonias. The central style is surrounded by four yellow anthers which are also joined at the base with the tips rolled back, so that it resembles a cross when viewed end-on. Flowering occurs mainly from late winter to summer, sometimes in other months. Flowering is followed by fruit which are fleshy green drupes giving the appearance of a bunch of grapes.

Taxonomy and naming
Persoonia pinifolia was first formally described in 1810 by Robert Brown from specimens collected "near Port Jackson", and the description was published in Transactions of the Linnean Society of London. The specific epithet (pinifolia) is derived from the Latin words pinus meaning "pine" and folium meaning "leaf".

Ecology
The fruits of P. pinifolia are taken by birds, including pied currawong, satin and regent bowerbirds, olive-backed oriole and Lewin's honeyeater but how this affects seed dispersal is not known. Unlike most Proteaceae, Persoonia pinifolia does not have proteoid roots.

Use in horticulture
One of the more widely cultivated geebungs in eastern Australia, though by no means common, P. pinifolia is a fairly reliable garden plant. The main reason it is not more widely available is the difficulties encountered in propagation by either seed or cuttings. Seed is very difficult to germinate; a combination of inhibitors and a thick impermeable endocarp contribute to this notorious reputation. Under natural conditions fire appears to enhance germination, though the use of artificial smoke products seem to have no effect on improving the results. It can be assumed fire has a physical effect such as 'cracking' the endocarp or in association with water/rain/moisture improving permeability of the endocarp. It can also be assumed that smoke possibly does improve germination, but artificial conditions don't provide the means for smoke to permeate to the seed embryo. Cuttings have been tried with many combinations of root-inducing hormones along with honey, sugar and coconut milk. The common rooting rate is < 1%. Results like this make the plant an unviable proposition for the professional nurseryperson and the amateur.

Research propagation has been taking place by a nurseryman on the far south coast of NSW during the period 2012-2017. He has consistently been achieving rooting rates of around 85% in trials using a minimum of one hundred cuttings. The scant information released suggests time of year, cutting length, temperature, wounding and hormone grade are important factors to consistently good results.

Tissue culture has been shown to be successful with P. pinifolia and some other species of persoonia.

References

External links
Botanic Gardens Trust: Persoonia pinifolia
Plants for a Future: Persoonia pinifolia

Flora of New South Wales
pinifolia
Garden plants
Plants described in 1810